The Altos 586 was a multi-user microcomputer intended for the business market.  It was introduced by Altos Computer Systems in 1983. A configuration with 512 kB of RAM, an Intel 8086 processor, Microsoft Xenix, and 10 MB hard drive cost about US$8,000. 3Com offered this Altos 586 product as a file server for their IBM PC networking solution in spring 1983. The network was 10Base-2 (thin-net) based, with an Ethernet AUI port on the Altos 586.

Reception 
BYTE in August 1984 called the Altos 586 "an excellent multiuser UNIX system", with "the best performance" for the price among small Unix systems. The magazine reported that a  Altos with 512 kB RAM and 40 MB hard drive "under moderate load approaches DEC VAX performance for most tasks that a user would normally invoke". A longer review in March 1985 stated that "despite some bugs, it's a good product". It criticized the documentation and lack of customer service for developers, but praised the multiuser performance. The author reported that his 586 had run a multiuser bulletin board system 24 hours a day for more than two years with no hardware failures. He concluded that "Very few UNIX or XENIX computers can provide all of the features of the 586 for $8990", especially for multiuser turnkey business users.

See also 
 Fortune XP 20

References 

Microcomputers
Computer-related introductions in 1983
16-bit computers
Computer systems
Silicon Valley
Software companies based in California